In calculus, the reciprocal rule gives the derivative of the reciprocal of a function f in terms of the derivative of f. The reciprocal rule can be used to show that the power rule holds for negative exponents if it has already been established for positive exponents. Also, one can readily deduce the quotient rule from the reciprocal rule and the product rule.

The reciprocal rule states that if f is differentiable at a point x and f(x) ≠ 0 then g(x) = 1/f(x) is also differentiable at x and

Proof 

The limit of this product exists and is equal to the product of the existing limits of its factors:

A weak reciprocal rule that follows algebraically from the product rule 

It may be argued that since

an application of the product rule says that

and this may be algebraically rearranged to say

However, this fails to prove that 1/f is differentiable at x; it is valid only when differentiability of 1/f at x is already established. In that way, it is a weaker result than the reciprocal rule proved above. However, in the context of differential algebra, in which there is nothing that is not differentiable and in which derivatives are not defined by limits, it is in this way that the reciprocal rule and the more general quotient rule are established.

Application to generalization of the power rule 

Often the power rule, stating that , is proved by methods that are valid only when n is a nonnegative integer. This can be extended to negative integers n by letting , where m is a positive integer.

Application to a proof of the quotient rule 

The reciprocal rule is a special case of the quotient rule, which states that if f and g are differentiable at x and g(x) ≠ 0 then

The quotient rule can be proved by writing

and then first applying the product rule, and then applying the reciprocal rule to the second factor.

Application to differentiation of trigonometric functions 

By using the reciprocal rule one can find the derivative of the secant and cosecant functions.

For the secant function:

The cosecant is treated similarly:

See also

References

Articles containing proofs
Differentiation rules
Theorems in analysis
Theorems in calculus